A bibliography of Edna St. Vincent Millay.

Poetry

Well-known poems
"Renascence" (1912)
"The Penitent" (1918)
"First Fig" (1920)
"Euclid Alone Has Looked on Beauty Bare" (1922)
"The Ballad of the Harp-Weaver" (1922)
"I, Being Born a Woman and Distressed" (1923)
"Dirge without Music" (1928)

Books of poetry
  (title poem first published under name E. Vincent Millay in The Lyric Year, 1912; collection includes God's World), M. Kennerley, 1917. reprinted, Books for Libraries Press, 1972.
 A Few Figs From Thistles: Poems and Four Sonnets, F. Shay, 1920. 2nd [enlarged] 
  (poems; includes Spring, Ode to Silence, and The Beanstalk); reprinted, Harper, 1935
 The Ballad of the Harp-Weaver, F. Shay, 1922. Reprinted as "The Harp-Weaver" in The Harp-Weaver, and Other Poems (includes "The Concert", "Euclid Alone has Looked on Beauty Bare", and "Sonnets from an Ungrafted Tree"), Harper, 1923.
 Poems, M. Secker, 1923.
 (Under pseudonym Nancy Boyd) Distressing Dialogues, preface by Edna St. Vincent Millay, Harper, 1924.
  (includes The Buck in the Snow [also see below] and On Hearing a Symphony of Beethoven).
 Fatal Interview (sonnets), Harper, 1931.
 Wine from These Grapes (poems; includes "Epitaph for the Race of Man" and "In the Grave No Flower"), Harper, 1934.
 (Translator with George Dillon and author of introduction) Charles Baudelaire, Flowers of Evil, Harper, 1936.
 Conversation at Midnight (narrative poem), Harper, 1937.
 Huntsman, What Quarry? (poems), Harper, 1939.
 There Are No Islands, Any More: Lines Written in Passion and in Deep Concern for England, France, and My Own Country, Harper, 1940.
 Make Bright the Arrows: 1940 Notebook (poems), Harper, 1940.
 The Murder of Lidice (poem), Harper, 1942.
 Second April and The Buck in the Snow, introduction by William Rose Benét, Harper, 1950.
 Mine the Harvest (poems), edited by Norma Millay, Harper, 1954.
 Take Up the Song, Harper, 1986. Reprinted with music by William Albright as Take Up the Song: Soprano Solo, Mixed Chorus, and Piano, Henmar Press, 1994.
 Colin Falck (ed) Selected Poems: The Centenary Edition, New York, NY : Harper Collins Publishers, 1991. , 
Early Poems. Edited by Holly Peppe. Penguin, 1998. Penguin Twentieth-Century Classics.

Plays
 (And director) Aria da capo (one-act play in verse; first produced in Greenwich Village, NY, December 5, 1919), M. Kennerley, 1921 (also see below).
 The Lamp and the Bell (five-act play; first produced June 18, 1921), F. Shay, 1921 (also see below).
 Two Slatterns and a King: A Moral Interlude (play), Stewart Kidd, 1921.
 Three Plays (contains Two Slatterns and a King, Aria da capo, and The Lamp and the Bell), Harper, 1926.
 (Author of libretto) The King's Henchman (three-act play; first produced in New York, February 17, 1927), Harper, 1927.
 The Princess Marries the Page (one-act play), Harper, 1932.
Early Works of Edna St. Vincent Millay: Selected Poetry and Three Plays. Edited by Stacy Carson Hubbard. Barnes & Noble, 2006. The plays are Aria da Capo, The Lamp and the Bell, and Two Slatterns and a King.

Letters
 Letters of Edna St. Vincent Millay, edited by Allan Ross Macdougall, Harper, 1952.

References
Except where noted, bibliographic information courtesy The Poetry Foundation.
 

Bibliographies by writer
Bibliographies of American writers
Poetry bibliographies
Dramatist and playwright bibliographies